Wewak is the capital of the East Sepik province of Papua New Guinea. It is on the northern coast of the island of New Guinea. It is the largest town between Madang and Jayapura. It is the see city (seat) of the Roman Catholic Diocese of Wewak.

History
Between 1943 and 1945, in World War II, Wewak was the site of the largest Japanese airbase in mainland New Guinea. The base was subjected to repeated bombing by Australian and American forces, most notably in one massive attack on 17 August 1943. Directly to the west of the town centre is a peninsula known as Cape Wom, which was the site of the surrender of Japanese forces in New Guinea on 13 September 1945. The site now houses a small memorial. The former Japanese airfield is still in use as the Wewak International Airport. 
In August 1945 two war crimes trials were held near Wewak for mutilation and cannibalism. First Lieutenant Takehiro Tazaki was convicted and sentenced to death (later commuted to 5 years imprisonment with hard labour) and another accused was acquitted.

Geography
The old centre of the town is on a small peninsula, with the rest of the urban area occupying a narrow band of flat land between the ocean and the coastal range of mountains that emerges a short distance inland.

To the east of the town center is a small peninsula on which is located Boram Hospital, and Wewak International Airport, which is also known as Boram.

Wewak is linked by road to three villages on the Sepik River: Angoram, Timbunke, and Pagwi, though the roads are not always in good condition. Also, a coastal highway extends to the west, linking Wewak with the coastal towns of Aitape and Vanimo, which is the capital of Sandaun province.

Climate
Köppen-Geiger climate classification system classifies its climate as tropical rainforest (Af).

See also
Wewak District
Wewak Rural LLG
Wewak Urban LLG
Wewak Islands Rural LLG

References

External links

Tourist Information

Provincial capitals in Papua New Guinea
Port cities in Oceania
Populated places in East Sepik Province